The Clopton Bridge is a Late Medieval masonry arch bridge with 14 pointed arches, located in Stratford-upon-Avon, England, which spans the River Avon, crossing at the place where the river was forded in Saxon times, and which gave the town its name. The bridge is still in use carrying the A3400 road over the river, and is grade I listed.

The bridge was built in around 1484, financed by Hugh Clopton of Clopton House, who later became Lord Mayor of London. It replaced a timber bridge which was first mentioned in 1235, and which had been described by John Leland as "but a poore Bridge of Timber, and no causey [causeway] to come to it", "very smaulle and ille, and at hygh waters very harde to passe by". 

Two arches were rebuilt in 1524. The bridge was again repaired in 1588 following flooding, and in 1642 after an arch had been destroyed to block the army of Oliver Cromwell. In 1696, money was raised to heighten the parapets, which were as low as four inches in places. The bridge was widened on the north side (upstream) in 1811, and a ten-sided toll-house tower added in 1814. A cast-iron footbridge was added to the north side in 1827.

John Leland described the bridge as:

a great and sumptuous Bridge upon Avon at the East Ende of the Towne, which hath 14 great Arches of Stone and long Causey made of Stone, low walled on each side, at the West Ende of the Bridge.

The bridge is now a Grade I listed building and a Scheduled Ancient Monument.

See also
Tramway Bridge
List of crossings of the River Avon, Warwickshire

References

External links

 The annotated "Clopton Bridge"; English Folk Dance

Bridges in Warwickshire
Bridges completed in 1484
Arch bridges in the United Kingdom
Scheduled monuments in Warwickshire
Grade I listed buildings in Warwickshire
Former toll bridges in England
Buildings and structures in Stratford-upon-Avon
1484 establishments in England